Thomas Brian McKelvie Fairfax, 13th Lord Fairfax of Cameron (14 May 1923 – 8 April 1964), was a Scottish nobleman, peer, and Conservative politician.

Early life
Thomas Brian McKelvie Fairfax was born on 14 May 1923 and was the son of Albert Fairfax, 12th Lord Fairfax of Cameron (1870–1939), and Maude Wishart McKelvie, daughter of James McKelvie, who were married in 1922. He had a younger brother, Peregrine John Wishart Fairfax (1925–2012).

Career
He served in the Second World War as a lieutenant in the Grenadier Guards. In 1945, he was elected a Scottish Representative Peer, and served as Parliamentary Private Secretary to the Lord President of the Council (Lord Woolton and Lord Salisbury respectively) from 1951 to 1953 and to the Minister of Materials (Lord Woolton) between 1953 and 1954. In 1954 he was made a Lord-in-waiting (government whip in the House of Lords), a post he held until 1957.

Personal life
In 1951, Lord Fairfax of Cameron married Sonia Helen Gunston (1926–2017), younger daughter of Cecil Bernard Gunston, MC, and his wife Lady Doris Hamilton-Temple-Blackwood. Lady Doris was the eldest daughter of Terence Hamilton-Temple-Blackwood, 2nd Marquess of Dufferin and Ava (1866–1918). They had:
Serena Frances Fairfax (born 12 December 1952)
Nicholas Fairfax, 14th Lord Fairfax of Cameron (born 4 January 1956), who married Annabel Morriss, daughter of Nicholas and Sarah Gilham Morriss
Hugh Nigel Thomas Fairfax (born 29 March 1958)
Rupert Alexander James Fairfax (born 21 January 1961)
He died in April 1964, aged only 40, and was succeeded by his eight-year-old son, Nicholas.  In 1967, his widow Lady Fairfax of Cameron was appointed Temporary Lady of the Bedchamber to Queen Elizabeth II.

See also
Lord Fairfax of Cameron

References 

 Kidd, Charles, Williamson, David (editors). Debrett's Peerage and Baronetage (1990 edition). New York: St Martin's Press, 1990.
 

1923 births
1964 deaths
Grenadier Guards officers
British Army personnel of World War II
Scottish representative peers
Thomas
Conservative Party (UK) Baronesses- and Lords-in-Waiting
Lords Fairfax of Cameron
Ministers in the third Churchill government, 1951–1955
Ministers in the Eden government, 1955–1957
Ministers in the Macmillan and Douglas-Home governments, 1957–1964